Regular way is a finance term describing a trade that is settled through the regular settlement cycle for that particular investment. The settlement cycle starts the day the trade is made and ends when it is paid for. The length is two days for foreign exchange markets and three days for corporate debt.

Resources
"Regular-Way Trade - RW". Investopedia.com. Retrieved Jun. 21, 2006.

Financial economics